Classe mista (internationally released as Coeds) is a 1976 commedia sexy all'italiana directed by Mariano Laurenti.

Plot 
Tonino is a high school student, in love with the new teacher of letters, Mrs. Moretti. One day Tonino and the teacher are kidnapped and locked up in a trullo where they consummate their love. Later, Moretti is transferred to Rome, and a new and beautiful teacher is assigned to Toninos class.

Cast 
 Femi Benussi as Zia Tecla 
 Alfredo Pea as Tonino Licata 
 Dagmar Lassander as Carla Moretti 
 Mario Carotenuto as Felice Licata 
 Gianfranco D'Angelo as Ciccio, il bidello
 Gabriele Di Giulio as Salvatore Scognamiglio 
 Alvaro Vitali as Angelino Zampanò  
 Patrizia Webley as Prof. De Santis
 Michele Gammino as Prof. Finocchiaro

References

External links

1976 films
Commedia sexy all'italiana
Films directed by Mariano Laurenti
Italian coming-of-age films
Italian high school films
1970s sex comedy films
Films scored by Gianni Ferrio
1976 comedy films
1970s Italian films